Prisca Carin is a Martiniquais footballer who plays as a forward for the  Martinique women's national team.

References

External links 
 
 http://www.soccerwire.com/tag/prisca-carin/
 https://web.archive.org/web/20150317150640/http://www.nwslsoccer.com/News/843433.html
 http://cfufootball.org/index.php/component/content/article/97-tournaments/caribbean-cup/9477-trinidad-and-tobago-scores-big-in-cfu-women-s-caribbean-cup

Living people
Martiniquais women's footballers
Women's association football forwards
Martinique women's international footballers
Year of birth missing (living people)